Skidmore may refer to:

Places

United States 
 Skidmore, Kansas
 Skidmore, Maryland
 Skidmore, Michigan
 Skidmore, Missouri
 Skidmore, Texas
 Skidmore, West Virginia
 Skidmore Fountain, a public fountain in Portland, Oregon

Other uses
 Skidmore (surname), a family name
 Skidmore College, in Saratoga Springs, New York, USA

See also
 Skidmore, Owings & Merrill, an architecture firm